Nicolae Martinescu (24 February 1940 – 1 April 2013) was a Greco-Roman wrestler from Romania. He competed at the 1964, 1968, 1972 and 1976 Olympics and won a gold medal in 1972, placing third in 1968 and fourth in 1964. At the 1976 Olympics he served as the flag bearer for Romania at the opening ceremony. Martinescu won a European title in 1966 and five medals at the world championships between 1963 and 1974. Domestically he collected 18 Romanian national titles between 1961 and 1978. 

In 1972, he was awarded the title of Merited Master of Sport of the USSR. After retiring from competitions he worked at the Romanian Wrestling Federation. Martinescu died aged 73 in Bucharest. 

He wife is folk singer Mioara Velicu.

References

1940 births
2013 deaths
Olympic wrestlers of Romania
Wrestlers at the 1964 Summer Olympics
Wrestlers at the 1968 Summer Olympics
Wrestlers at the 1972 Summer Olympics
Wrestlers at the 1976 Summer Olympics
Romanian male sport wrestlers
Olympic gold medalists for Romania
Olympic bronze medalists for Romania
Olympic medalists in wrestling
Honoured Masters of Sport of the USSR
World Wrestling Championships medalists
Medalists at the 1972 Summer Olympics
Medalists at the 1968 Summer Olympics
European Wrestling Championships medalists
20th-century Romanian people